2008 Summer Olympics Parade of Nations was part of the opening ceremony that originating with the 1896 Olympic Games. The national team from each nation participating in the Olympic Games paraded behind their national flag into the Olympic Stadium. The flag bearer was an athlete of each national delegation chosen, to represent the athletes, either by the National Olympic Committee or by the national team.

Parade order
Per tradition, the national team of Greece, which hosted the previous Summer Olympics, in Athens, entered first as the progenitor of the Olympic Games, and the host country, in this case  China, marched last. Each nation marched in name order in the language of the host nation, which in this case is the Chinese language. The collation method used is based on the names as written in Simplified Chinese characters and is similar to that used in Chinese dictionaries. The names were sorted by the number of strokes in the first character of the name, then by the stroke order of the character (in the order 橫竖撇捺折, c.f. Wubi method), then the number of strokes and stroke order of the second character, then next character and so on. For example, this placed Australia in 202nd position, just ahead of Zambia because the initial character for "Australia" is written in 15 strokes, while that for "Zambia" is written in 16 strokes.

An exception to the ordering was Macedonia, which entered under its provisional designation as used by the IOC, "former Yugoslav Republic of Macedonia", but was sorted under 马其顿 (Mǎqídùn = "Macedonia.")

After marching in as a joint team in the previous two editions of the games, North Korea (Choson – 朝鲜; pinyin: Cháoxiǎn) and South Korea (Hanguk – 韩国; pinyin: Hánguó) marched in separate teams after negotiations failed for political reasons. The North Korean delegation were initially slated to march immediately after the South Korean delegation in stroke collation order, but successfully requested to be moved three teams later in the parade order.

The Marshall Islands, Montenegro and Tuvalu participation in the Olympic Games with their debut at these Games, and Serbia competed under this name for the first time after the 1912 Summer Olympics. Montenegro and Serbia were previously part of Yugoslavia and Serbia and Montenegro. Brunei was excluded from the Games by the IOC shortly before the Opening Ceremony as no athletes had been registered. Brunei athletes would have marched 36th between Uzbekistan and Barbados.

Announcers in the stadium read off the names of the marching nations in French, English, (the official languages of the Olympics) and Mandarin Chinese with music accompanying the athletes as they marched into the stadium.

List
The following is a list of each country's flag bearer. The list is sorted by the sequence that each nation appeared in the parade of nations.  The names are given in their official designations by the IOC, and the Chinese names follow their official designations by the Beijing Organizing Committee for the Olympic Games.

Notes

See also
 2004 Summer Olympics national flag bearers
 2008 Summer Paralympics national flag bearers
 2010 Winter Olympics national flag bearers
 2022 Winter Olympics national flag bearers

References
Main reference: 

Flag bearers
Lists of Olympic flag bearers
Parades in China